Kedron Brook busway station is located in Brisbane, Australia serving the suburb of Kedron. It opened on 18 June 2012 when the Northern Busway was extended from Windsor.

It is served by four routes all operated by Brisbane Transport.

References

External links
[ Kedron Brook station] TransLink

Bus stations in Brisbane
Kedron, Queensland
Transport infrastructure completed in 2012